Fort Dodge is a city in Webster County, Iowa, U.S.

It may also refer to:
 Fort Dodge, Kansas, an unincorporated community in Ford County, Kansas, U.S.
 Fort Dodge (US Army Post), 19th-century military base in Kansas, U.S.

See also
 Dodge City, Kansas
 Dodge (disambiguation)